Sphalmium is a monotypic genus of flowering plants in the protea family. The only species, Sphalmium racemosum, is a large forest tree. Common names include satin silky oak, mystery oak, Mt Lewis oak, poorman's fishtail oak and buff silky oak.

It is endemic to the upland rainforests of the wet tropics region of north-eastern Queensland, Australia.

History
Botanists Barbara Briggs, Bernie Hyland and Lawrie Johnson named the new genus, updated the description and named the new species combination in 1975. They based the new species combination name on Cyril T. White's 1939 description of Orites racemosa, now a synonym.

References

Proteaceae
Monotypic Proteaceae genera
Proteales of Australia
Trees of Australia
Taxa named by Cyril Tenison White
Endemic flora of Queensland
Wet Tropics of Queensland